Plagiosauroidea is a superfamily of Temnospondyli that lived in the Triassic period.

A clade was in 2000 defined as Laidleria + Plagiosauridae.

References
Warren (1998), Laidleria uncovered: a redescription of Laidleria gracilis Kitching (1957), a temnospondyl from the Cynognathus Zone of South Africa. Zool. J. Linn. Soc. 122: 167–185. 
Yates & Warren (2000), The phylogeny of the 'higher' temnospondyls (Vertebrata: Choanata) and its implications for the monophyly and origins of the Stereospondyli. Zool. J. Linnean Soc. 128: 77–121.

External links
Plagiosauroidea at Palaeos.

Trematosaurs
Triassic temnospondyls
Early Triassic first appearances
Late Triassic extinctions